German submarine U-447 was a Type VIIC U-boat built for Nazi Germany's Kriegsmarine for service during World War II.
She was laid down on 1 July 1941 by Schichau-Werke, Danzig as yard number 1507, launched on 30 April 1942 and commissioned on 11 July 1942 under Oberleutnant zur See Friedrich-Wilhelm Bothe.

Design
German Type VIIC submarines were preceded by the shorter Type VIIB submarines. U-447 had a displacement of  when at the surface and  while submerged. She had two shafts and two  propellers.

U-447 was fitted with five  torpedo tubes (four fitted at the bow and one at the stern), fourteen torpedoes, one  SK C/35 naval gun, 220 rounds, and a  C/30 anti-aircraft gun. The boat had a complement of between forty-four and sixty.

Service history
The boat's career began with training at 8th U-boat Flotilla on 11 July 1942, followed by active service on 1 March 1943 as part of the 9th Flotilla for the remainder of her service. In 2 patrols she sank no ships.

Wolfpacks
U-447 took part in three wolfpacks, namely:
 Neuland (4 – 6 March 1943)
 Ostmark (6 – 11 March 1943)
 Drossel (29 April – 7 May 1943)

Fate
U-447 was sunk on 7 May 1943 in the North Atlantic in position , by depth charges from 2 RAF Hudson bombers from 233 Squadron. All crew members died.

References

Bibliography

External links

German Type VIIC submarines
1942 ships
U-boats commissioned in 1942
Ships lost with all hands
U-boats sunk in 1943
U-boats sunk by depth charges
U-boats sunk by British aircraft
World War II shipwrecks in the Atlantic Ocean
World War II submarines of Germany
Ships built in Danzig
Maritime incidents in May 1943
Ships built by Schichau